Kwoma may refer to:
Kwoma people, a people of northeastern New Guinea
Kwoma language, the language of the Kwoma people